VA242 may refer to:
 Ariane flight VA242, an Ariane 5 launch that occurred on 5 April 2018
 Virgin Australia flight 242, with IATA flight number VA242
 Virginia State Route 242 (VA-242), a primary state highway in the United States